This is the list of notable stars in the constellation Vulpecula, sorted by decreasing brightness.

See also
 List of stars by constellation
 SGR 1935+2154

Notes

References
 
 
 
 

List
Vulpecula